Murray Brown

 Murray Brown (cricketer) (born 1946), New Zealand cricketer
 Murray Brown (economist) (born 1936), Canadian economist
 Murray Brown (umpire) (born 1966), South African cricket umpire